Down to Earth is the fourth studio album by the British hard rock band Rainbow. It is their last album to feature drummer Cozy Powell and their only album with vocalist Graham Bonnet. Released in 1979, it contains Rainbow's first hit single "Since You Been Gone", marking a more commercial direction of the band's sound.

Writing and recording
The writing of Down to Earth began at Ritchie Blackmore's house in Connecticut in December 1978. By that time, he had dismissed both bassist Bob Daisley and keyboard player David Stone soon after singer Ronnie James Dio quit the band. Blackmore had already recruited his old Deep Purple bandmate Roger Glover as producer and started auditioning musicians for the vacant slots in the band, while songwriting progressed with Blackmore, Cozy Powell and session musician Clive Chaman on bass. The backing tracks were largely written by Blackmore and Glover. "It was a great opportunity for me, and why should I bear a grudge [about being dismissed from Purple in 1973]?" recalled Glover. "I'm a huge Ritchie fan. Some of my biggest influences have come from him."

By the end of 1978, Blackmore had recruited keyboardist Don Airey – a suggestion from Powell – and considered Ian Gillan and Peter Goalby of Trapeze to replace Dio. In April 1979, Jack Green of The Pretty Things was hired as new bass player for the recording sessions at Château Pelly de Cornfeld, in the countryside of Southern France, but he did not stay for long. Producer Glover ended up playing bass on the album and provided lyrics for all songs. While auditions for the new singer proceeded, Glover tracked down ex-The Marbles singer Graham Bonnet, who auditioned in France and was immediately hired.

During song composition, Bonnet composed his vocal melodies though his contributions remained uncredited. His vocals were not recorded with the other tracks in France, but later at Kingdom Sound Studios in Long Island, when all other recording sessions were completed. Down to Earth is the only Rainbow album to feature Bonnet, though he was still part of the band when writing for Difficult to Cure began.

Also recorded for the proposed next single, but unreleased due to Bonnet's departure, was "Will You Love Me Tomorrow". Bonnet had previously recorded this song for his first, eponymously titled, solo album in 1977. Rainbow's version was recorded in the studio in May 1980, during rehearsals for the Japanese leg of the Down to Earth tour. It was subsequently played live throughout that tour.

Tour
In 1980, Blackmore's Rainbow headlined the inaugural Monsters of Rock festival at Castle Donington in England.

Songs from Down to Earth have been performed by Graham Bonnet at his solo shows, as well as at concerts performed with Don Airey (2001) and Joe Lynn Turner (2007).

Release
In the UK there was a limited edition clear vinyl LP release.

"Bad Girl", an outtake from the album sessions, was used as the B-side to the "Since You Been Gone" single. Similarly, "Weiss Heim", an instrumental recorded in Copenhagen in January 1980, was the B-side to "All Night Long".

A remastered CD reissue was released in May 1999, with packaging duplicating the original vinyl.

In 2011, a Deluxe Edition of the album was released, featuring a bonus disc with previously unreleased songs and instrumental versions of the basic tracks.

Reception

AllMusic editor Stephen Thomas Erlewine defines the album "a fine hard rock platter", which "might not offer anything unique, but it delivers the goods." He criticizes mostly Bonnet's vocals, but praises "the guitar artistry and mystical sensibility of Ritchie Blackmore", who "sounds invigorated on the album". PopMatters' Adrien Begrand, reviewing the 2011 Deluxe Edition, remarks how Down to Earth "is somewhat underrated compared to the towering Dio discography, but it remains a strong outing 31 years later", even with "the new material sounding so much more stripped-down compared to the overtly epic heavy metal arrangements of Dio-era Rainbow". The songs are "eight searing, hooky hard rockers", remarkably rendered by Bonnet's performance and energy. The album "is perhaps the most divisive record in Rainbow’s catalogue" according to  Record Collector reviewer, because of "Blackmore's single-minded pursuit of mainstream success" and the departure from the sound of preceding albums. He adds that this is a "strong" album with many "classic radio" staples, but the second disc of the Deluxe Edition does not add anything essential to the listening experience.

In 2005, Down to Earth was ranked number 431 in Rock Hard magazine's book The 500 Greatest Rock & Metal Albums of All Time.

Blackmore's opinion

In an interview with Sounds in 1979, Blackmore said: "I have so much respect for classical musicians that when I listen to myself I think, oh, that's nonsense.  I can put down other people's music because the fact is I put down my own music and say it's rubbish.  A lot of it is- not all of it- "No Time to Lose" definitely is but "Eyes of the World" is OK.  But a good deal of it is a waste of time."

Track listing

2011 deluxe edition track listing

Personnel
Rainbow
 Ritchie Blackmore – guitar
 Cozy Powell – drums
 Roger Glover – bass, producer
 Don Airey – keyboards
 Graham Bonnet – vocals

Production
Gary Edwards - engineer
Michael Palmer, Leigh Mantle - assistant engineers
Greg Calbi - mastering

Charts 
 

Album

Singles

Certifications

References

1979 albums
Rainbow (rock band) albums
Albums produced by Roger Glover
Polydor Records albums